Walter Eric Aronson (March 28, 1917, Norrtälje – March 11, 2010) was a Swedish bobsledder who competed in the 1950s and in the 1960s. He won a bronze medal in the four-man event (tied with West Germany) at the 1953 FIBT World Championships in Garmisch-Partenkirchen.

At the 1956 Winter Olympics he finished 13th in the four-man event. He also competed in the two-man event but was not able to finish.

Eight years later he finished eleventh in the four-man event at the 1964 Winter Olympics.

External links
Bobsleigh four-man world championship medalists since 1930
Walter Aronson's profile at the Swedish Olympic Committee 

1917 births
2010 deaths
People from Norrtälje Municipality
Swedish male bobsledders
Olympic bobsledders of Sweden
Bobsledders at the 1956 Winter Olympics
Bobsledders at the 1964 Winter Olympics
Sportspeople from Stockholm County
20th-century Swedish people